The 2004 National Camogie League is a competition in the women's team field sport of camogie was won by Tipperary, who defeated Wexford in the final, played at Nowlan Park.

Arrangements
Wexford overcame defending champions Cork in the semi-final at Wexford Park with a brilliant second half display. Cork, who had the wind advantage in the opening half, were 0-11 to 0-3 ahead at half time. The Wexford fight back began with a goal four minutes after the break from full-forward Michelle Hearne, who added another with three minutes of remaining.

Division 2
The Junior National League, known since 2006 as Division Two, was won by Kildare who defeated Laois in the final. Susie O'Carroll, with two goals in the opening 20 minutes, inspired Kildare to a fourth title as they withstood a determined Laois recovery

The Final
The two sides shared goals in the opening five minutes, Deirdre Hughes scoring after 90 seconds from close range, and Michelle Hearne quickly replying for Wexford. Eimear McDonnell and Deirdre Hughes again added further goals as Tipperary led 3-2 to 1-4 at half-time. Tipperary's experience was evident through the second half.

Final stages

References

External links
 Camogie Association

National Camogie League
2004